In the run up to the 1992 general election, various organisations carried out opinion polling to gauge voting intention in the United Kingdom. Results of such polls are displayed in this article. The date range for these opinion polls are from the election to 8 April.

Almost every poll leading up to polling day predicted either a hung parliament with Labour the largest party, or a small Labour majority of around 19 to 23. Polls on the last few days before the country voted predicted a very slim Labour majority. After the polls closed, the BBC and ITV exit polls still predicted that there would be a hung parliament and "that the Conservatives would only just get more seats than Labour".

With opinion polls at the end of the campaign showing Labour and the Conservatives neck and neck, the actual election result, a small Conservative majority, was a surprise to many in the media and in polling organisations. The apparent failure of the opinion polls to come close to predicting the actual result led to an inquiry by the Market Research Society. Following the election, most opinion polling companies changed their methodology in the belief that a 'Shy Tory factor' affected the polling.

Graphical summary

Results 
All data is from UK Polling Report.

1992

1991

1990

1989

1988

1987

References 

1992 United Kingdom general election
Opinion polling for United Kingdom general elections
Opinion polling for United Kingdom votes in the 1990s